The men's 5000 meter at the 2015 KNSB Dutch Single Distance Championships took place in Heerenveen at the Thialf ice skating rink on Friday 31 October 2014. There were 20 participants.

Statistics

Result

Source:

Referee: Jan Bolt  Starter: Janny Smegen 
Start: 15:13 hr. Finish: 16:51 hr.

Draw

References

Single Distance Championships
2015 Single Distance